Family with sequence similarity 221 member A is a protein in humans that is encoded by the FAM221A gene. FAM221A is a gene that is not yet well understood by the scientific community. However, it appears that this gene may have a role in Parkinson's disease and prostate cancer.

Gene

Location and Aliases
FAM221A is located on Chromosome 7. Its exact location is 7p15.3. It has one alias, which is C7orf46.

Expression
FAM221A has higher levels of expression in the liver, brain, fetal brain, thyroid and colon, but FAM221A has the highest level of expression in the spinal cord, pancreas and retina.

The promoter region of FAM221A is 1222 base pairs long. This was found using ElDorado at Genomatix.

Protein

Protein Analysis
The molecular weight of FAM221A is 33.1 kDa, and the isoelectric point is 6.01. Relative to other proteins in humans, FAM221A has a lower level of asparagine.

Post-Translational Modifications
Post-translational modifications of FAM221A include phosphorylation sites, glycosylation sites and sulfation sites. These have been conserved in mammals other than Homo sapiens, including the macaque, whale, finch and sometimes alligator. These sites were predicted using NetPhos 3.1, YinOYang 1.2 and The Sulfinator.

Secondary Structure
Key structures predicted in FAM221A are random coils and alpha helices, with 71% of the protein being random coils and 21% being helices. Extended strands were also found with 7% of the protein being these. Secondary structure was predicted using RaptorX, and a diagram of the predicted secondary structure is included below.

Homology/evolution

Paralogs
There exists one paralog for FAM221A: FAM221B. This diverged from FAM221A approximately 1781 million years ago.

Orthologs
Orthologs have been found in mammals, birds, reptiles and fish. FAM221A has also been conserved in invertebrates, but the similarity levels decrease at a faster rate. Orthologs were discovered using BLAST  and BLAT. While these are not the only orthologs that exist for FAM221A, a table of 20 orthologs is provided below. The ortholog with no accession number was created using BLAT.

Divergence of FAM221A
To understand the times when FAM221A diverged from different species, a graph was created. This compares the evolutionary history of FAM221A to Fibrinogen, which evolves quickly, and Cytochrome C, which evolves slowly. As seen in the graph, FAM221A diverges from other species at a moderate pace.

Clinical significance
FAM221A has a relatively high amount of expression in the brain and has been seen to have an association with neurodegenerative disorders such as Parkinson's disease and Alzheimer's disease. FAM221A has also been seen to have a higher level of expression in those who have prostate cancer versus healthy individuals. Furthermore, FAM221A has also been expressed in those with colorectal tumors.

Interacting Proteins
Three interacting proteins were found, which are SNX2, SNX5 and SNX6.

SNX2 and SNX6 share the same function, which is being involved in the stages of intracellular trafficking. SNX5 facilitates cargo retrieval from endosomes to the trans-golgi network.

References